The East Pahranagat Range is a Lincoln County, Nevada, mountain range in the Muddy River Watershed.

References 

Mountain ranges of Lincoln County, Nevada
Mountain ranges of Nevada